The Minister of Trade and Industry (Faroese: landsstýrismaðurin í vinnumálum, also called vinnumálaráðharrin), earlier Minister of Industry (landsstýrismaðurin í ídnaðarmálum, also called ídnaðarmálaráðharrin), is a member of the Faroese government and is responsible for trade, including natural resources except for fisheries, which mostly has its own ministry, labour environment, business, aquaculture etc.

Notes and references 

Faroe Islands
Trade